"Save Me" is a song by Australian singer Joelle Hadjia. The single, accompanied by a music video, was released on 15 April 2014.

Track listing
Digital download 
"Save Me" – 3:36

Credits and personnel
Recording
Mastered at Viking Lounge Mastering, Sydney 
Personnel
Joelle Hadjia – lead vocals and backing vocals, songwriter
Sergio Selim – producer, music production, mixing, programming
Paul Stefandis  – mastered, programming

Charts
"Save Me" debuted at number 56 on the ARIA Singles Chart.

References

2014 singles
2014 songs